Amé Pictet (July 12, 1857 – March 11, 1937) was a Swiss chemist. He discovered the Pictet–Spengler reaction, and the related Pictet–Hubert reaction and Pictet–Gams reaction.

Pictet was born in Geneva, studied with August Kekulé at the University of Bonn where he received his Ph.D. in 1879. From  1894 until 1932 he was professor at the University of Geneva. He is credited with publishing the first synthesis of nicotine.

References

External links
  Pictet Family Archives

1857 births
1937 deaths
Swiss chemists
Swiss Protestants
University of Bonn alumni
Academic staff of the University of Geneva
Scientists from Geneva